Água Boa Airport  is the airport serving Água Boa, Brazil. It is also known as Olhos d'água after the farm where it is located.

Airlines and destinations

Access

See also

List of airports in Brazil

References

External links

Airports in Mato Grosso